Be-Shaque is a 1981 Indian Hindi-language thriller drama film directed by Kashinath, starring Mithun Chakraborty, Yogeeta Bali, Amrish Puri and Shakti Kapoor. It is a remake of own Kannada directorial Aparichita.

Cast
Mithun Chakraborty as Prakash
Yogeeta Bali as Roopa
Shakti Kapoor as Mohan
Amrish Puri as Gopal
Jalal Agha as Mishra
Sonia Sahni as Nirmala
Suresh Chatwal as Police Officer
Paintal as Gangu
Mohan Choti as Lakhiya
Asha Chandra as Gauri
Vinod R. Mulani as Shyam Sunder

Plot

Shyam Sunder lives a wealthy lifestyle in a small village in India along with his widowed stepmother, Nirmala. He has taken to alcohol, womanizing & goes away very often without informing anyone. He frequently asks Nirmala for money. One day a villager Lucky informs Nirmala that he has seen Shyam's dead body. She arrives with other villagers but finds the dead carcass of a bear. Lucky informs the police. Nirmala is in a secret relationship with Mishra. Subsequently, a young man named Prakash arrives there & meets with Nirmala. He tells her that he is Shyam's friend and an author by profession. He is given a village tour by Nirmala's servant Gangu who later informs of villagers' whereabouts. She permits him to live in her spacious house but subsequently asks him to move to the guest house as told by Mishra. Prakash meets and falls in love with Roopa who lives a middle-class lifestyle with her widowed mother Radha, servant Gopal. Prakash overpowers goons sent by Mishra. Shyam had made villager Gauri pregnant who committed suicide as he did not marry her. Prakash informs Nirmala that he is doing business with Shyam & they were to get Rs 10 lakhs. Prakash denies her receiving Shyam's share & business' details. Shyam before his absence had a quarrel with Nirmala for money and threatened to expose her relationship with Mishra. Soon Roopa also falls in love with Prakash.  Prakash comes across a framed photograph of Roopa with a young man & a child in her arms in Gopal's house. Then Prakash is told about an abandoned house that has a ghastly secret. Roopa introduces him to her mom, who approves of him. He tells that he is the son of Lucknow-based Tehsildar Somshekhar. Prakash finds a body but is hit on the head. He finds the body gone on waking. Rest needs to be seen.

Soundtrack
"Preetam Tum Mere Rahoge Sada" - Usha Khanna, Suresh Wadkar
"Aa Jayena Aayena" - Asha Bhosle
"Haseen Haseen Wadiyon" - Anwar
"Uthao Jaam Masti Men" - Anwar

References

External links
 

1981 films
1980s Hindi-language films
Hindi remakes of Kannada films
Indian thriller films
1981 thriller films
Hindi-language thriller films
Films directed by Kashinath